Vania Stambolova (born 28 November 1983) is a Bulgarian athlete. She competes in the 400 m hurdles and the 400 m event. At the 2006 IAAF World Indoor Championships she won a silver medal over 400 m. She also won a gold medal at the 2006 European Championships. At present, Stambolova is the highest paid female athlete in Bulgaria.

During the London 2012 Olympics, Stambolova tripped while competing in the 400m hurdles event and failed to finish.

At the 2014 European Championships, she finished in 6th place in the 800 m, setting a personal best in the final.

Stambolova tested positive for testosterone in January 2007, and was subsequently suspended for two years by the IAAF.

Achievements

Personal bests
Outdoor:
200 metres: 22.81 (Sofia 2006)
400 metres: 49.53 (Rieti 2006)
400 metres hurdles: 53.68 (Rabat 2011)

Indoor:
200 metres : 23.51 (Sofia 2006)
400 metres : 50.21 (Moscow 2006)
800 metres : 2:02.03 (Vienna 2012)

See also
List of sportspeople sanctioned for doping offences

References

External links

1983 births
Living people
Bulgarian female hurdlers
Bulgarian female sprinters
Doping cases in athletics
Bulgarian sportspeople in doping cases
Athletes (track and field) at the 2012 Summer Olympics
Olympic athletes of Bulgaria
European Athletics Championships medalists
Sportspeople from Varna, Bulgaria
Universiade medalists in athletics (track and field)
Universiade gold medalists for Bulgaria
World Athletics Indoor Championships medalists
Medalists at the 2009 Summer Universiade
20th-century Bulgarian women
21st-century Bulgarian women